The Mafia Kills Only in Summer may refer to:
 The Mafia Kills Only in Summer (film)
 The Mafia Kills Only in Summer (TV series)